Alexander (Gr. ) was commander of the cavalry in the army of Antigonus III Doson during the war against Cleomenes III of Sparta. He fought against Philopoemen, then a young man, whose prudence and valor forced him to a disadvantageous engagement at Sellasia. This Alexander is probably the same person as the one whom Antigonus, as the guardian of Philip (son of Demetrius II of Macedon), had appointed commander of Philip's body-guard, and who was slandered by Apelles.  Subsequently he was sent by Philip as ambassador to Thebes, to persecute the Macedonian Megaleas. Polybius states that at all times he manifested a most extraordinary attachment to his king.

References 

3rd-century BC Macedonians
Antigonid generals
Ambassadors of Macedonia (ancient kingdom)